Allenanthus was a genus of flowering plants in the family Rubiaceae but is no longer recognized. It has been sunk into synonymy with Machaonia.

Taxonomy
Allenanthus was named by Paul Standley in 1940 in Annals of the Missouri Botanical Garden. It was named in honor of Paul Hamilton Allen (1911-1963).

Until 2004, two species had been recognized, but fieldwork has shown that there is a continuum of variation between them.

Comparisons of morphological characters and DNA sequences have shown that Allenanthus is embedded in Machaonia. This was confirmed by a molecular phylogenetic study of the subfamily Cinchonoideae in 2010. Because of these results, Allenanthus is no longer maintained as a separate genus.

Species
 Allenanthus erythrocarpus Standl.
 Allenanthus hondurensis Standl.

References

External links
 World Checklist of Rubiaceae
 Allenanthus At: Plant Names At: IPNI
 Allenanthus In: Volume 27 Of: AMBG At: Biodiversity Heritage Library
 Allenanthus At: Index Nominum Genericorum At: References At: NMNH Department of Botany At: Research and Collections At: Smithsonian National Museum of Natural History
 Allenanthus At: Guettardeae At: Cinchonoideae At: Rubiaceae In: Embryophyta At: Streptophytina At: Streptophyta At: Viridiplantae At: Eukaryota At: Taxonomy At: UniProt

Guettardeae
Taxonomy articles created by Polbot
Historically recognized Rubiaceae genera